Population regulation may refer to:
 Population control
 Wildlife management
 Human population planning